Type 12 Torpedo (12式短魚雷, 12 Shiki Tan Gyorai, development name G-RX5) is a lightweight anti-submarine homing torpedo developed by the Technical Research and Development Institute, a department of the Japanese Ministry of Defense and built by Mitsubishi Heavy Industries for the Japanese Maritime Self Defense Force.

References

Torpedoes of Japan
Post–Cold War weapons of Japan